Uchvarsi is a settlement in the Java district of South Ossetia, a region of Georgia whose sovereignty is disputed.

See also
 Java District

Notes

References  

Populated places in Dzau District